The Kansas City Royals are a franchise based in Kansas City, Missouri. They are members of the Central division of Major League Baseball's American League. The Royals franchise was formed in 1969.

There have been 20 managers for the Royals. Joe Gordon became the first manager of the Kansas City Royals in 1969, serving for one season. Bob Lemon became the first manager who held the title of manager for the Royals for more than one season. Ned Yost has managed more games than any other Royals manager and as many seasons as Dick Howser and Tony Muser. Whitey Herzog, Jim Frey, Howser, and Ned Yost are the only managers to have led the Royals into the playoffs. Three Royals managers—Gordon, Lemon, and Herzog—have been inducted into the Baseball Hall of Fame;

In 1970, Gordon was replaced with Charlie Metro. The Royals made their first playoff appearance under Herzog. Four managers have led the Royals into the postseason. Dick Howser led the Royals to their first World Series Championship in 1985. Ned Yost led the Royals into two World Series appearances, in the 2014 World Series, and a Win in the 2015 World Series. Frey, led the Royals to One world series appearance in the 1980 World Series. The highest winning percentage of any manager who managed at least one season was Herzog, with a percentage of .574. The lowest percentage was Bob Schaefer in 2005, although he managed for only 17 games. The lowest percentage of a manager with at least one season with the Royals was Buddy Bell, the manager from 2005 through the 2007 season with a percentage of .399.

The highest win total for a Royals manager is held by Yost, who also holds the record for losses. Tony Peña became the first Royals manager to win the Manager of the Year award, in 2003. Ned Yost was hired on May 13, 2010, after Trey Hillman was fired. Yost retired from coaching following the 2019 season, ending a 10-year tenure with Kansas City. Mike Matheny was hired as the new manager for the 2020 season in October 2019.

Table key

Managers
Statistics current through October 5th, 2022

Notes
 A running total of the number of managers of the Royals. Thus, any manager who has two or more separate terms is counted only once.

References

Kansas City Royals managers
Kansas City Royals
Managers